Tharg's Future Shocks is a long-running series of short strips in the British weekly comic 2000 AD in 1977.  The name originates from the fictional editor of 2000 AD and the book titled Future Shock, written by Alvin Toffler, published in 1970.

Publishing history
The series began in issue 25 of 2000 AD titled "Tharg's Future Shocks" in a single short story written by Steve Moore, who also created the format. This established the pattern of the series which would be two- or three-page short stories, which were normally self-contained.

These stories would be a testing ground for new artists and writers and creators resulting in the stories having a very mixed level of quality. Some successful authors such as Peter Milligan, Alan Davis, Alan Moore, and Grant Morrison found some of their earliest work published as Future Shocks.

Spin-offs

Some characters proved popular enough to either appear in their own stories, or have multiple appearances in Future Shocks, such as Alec Trench,  Bradley, D.R. and Quinch and Abelard Snazz.

Similar series

2000 AD also began several other science fiction and horror short stories under several different titles, including Time Twisters. Examples of the others include:

 Future Shorts, single page Future Shocks
 Past Imperfect 
 Pulp Sci-Fi 
 Ro-Jaws Robo Tales, stories presented by Ro-Jaws
 Tales from Beyond Science, a short run series all drawn by Rian Hughes
 Tales from the Black Museum, an equivalent set in Mega-City One
 Tales of Telguuth, a series of fantasy tales set on a distant planet, written by Steve Moore
 Tharg's Terror Tales, covering horror, that still occasionally appears
 Time Twisters, single episode stories, with a focus on time travel and subsequent paradoxes
 Vector 13 although wrapped in its own story stretching beyond the series, it still featured one off stories largely focused on anomalous or paranormal phenomena
 Bob Byrne's Twisted Tales

Collected editions
The stories have been collected into a number of trade paperbacks:

Two collections of Alan Moore's Future Shocks (Alan Moore's Shocking Futures) and Time Twisters (Alan Moore's Twisted Times) stories were released by Titan Books in 1986:

Alan Moore's Shocking Futures (1986), Titan Books; reprints a selection of Future Shocks short strips originally published in 2000 AD between 1981 and 1983, with various artists. 
Alan Moore's Twisted Times (1987), Titan Books; reprints almost all of Moore's Abelard Snazz strips, and a further selection of Time Twisters short strips originally published in 2000 AD between 1980 and 1983, with various artists. 

The contents of those two volumes have been collected together into a single volume, along with additional material from Moore:

The Complete Future Shocks (tpb, Rebellion Developments, 2006 )
Despite the title, this is not a complete collection of all Future Shock stories from the comic, only the Alan Moore stories in the 1986 and 1987 books described above.

All the Future Shocks written by Peter Milligan, John Smith, and Neil Gaiman and around half of Grant Morrison's were collected in:

The Best of Tharg's Future Shocks (160 pages, November 2008)

A series of paperbacks collecting all Future Shocks is being published by Rebellion:

 The Complete Future Shocks Volume 1 (320 pages, July 2018) covers 1977–1981
 The Complete Future Shocks Volume 2 (272 pages, August 2019) covers 1981–1982

References

External links
 Complete list of Future Shock stories at the official 2000 AD website

2000 AD comic strips